Louis Nicolas (August 15, 1634 – 1682?) was a French missionary in Canada in the late 17th and early 18th century. At the age of about 30, this Jesuit priest arrived in New France in 1664 and stayed for eleven years. He returned to France in 1675, and historians believe that he died in 1682.

Nicolas was born in Aubenas, Vivarais, a commune in the Ardèche department. At the age of twenty, he joined the Jesuits, a male congregation of the Catholic Church. In 1664, his order was sent to Canada to convert the Aboriginal peoples. As he travelled from the western end of Lake Superior to Sept-Îles, and from Trois-Rivières to the south of Lake Ontario, Nicolas’ interest in Aboriginal languages and culture increased. Nonetheless, according to the Jesuit Relations, Nicolas did not always behave accordingly towards the native peoples. In fact, in a memoir by Antoine Alet, secretary to Sulpician superior M. de Queylus, the Jesuit was "described as a quick-tempered and rather vain man." Moreover, his congregation was not pleased with him as he attempted to tame two bear cubs at the Jesuits' residence in Sillery, in the hope of impressing the king. In his own writings, Nicolas appears to have been more interested in exploring and observing nature than in the conversion goals of the Jesuits.

In 1675, Louis Nicolas left Canada and returned to France. Nothing more was heard of him after his departure.

References

Further reading

Gagnon, François-Marc. Louis Nicolas: Life & Work. Toronto: Art Canada Institute, 2017.

External links
Codex canadensis at Library and Archives Canada

1634 births
1682 deaths
People from Aubenas
17th-century French Jesuits
French Roman Catholic missionaries
Roman Catholic missionaries in Canada
Jesuit missionaries in New France